Dead Silence is a 2007 American supernatural horror film directed by James Wan and written by Leigh Whannell. The film stars Ryan Kwanten as Jamie Ashen, a young widower returning to his hometown to search for answers to his wife's death. It also stars Amber Valletta, Donnie Wahlberg, and Bob Gunton.

Dead Silence was theatrically released in the United States on March 16, 2007, by Universal Pictures. The film was dedicated to Gregg Hoffman. Despite receiving initial negative reviews, the film has since gathered a cult following.

Plot
Jamie Ashen and his pregnant wife, Lisa, receive an anonymous gift of a ventriloquist doll called "Billy". When Jamie goes out to pick up their takeout dinner, a figure walks by Lisa, and attacks her only after she screams, killing both her and the baby. Jamie returns home and finds out that Lisa is dead, and that her tongue has been cut off; Jamie is arrested for presumably killing her. After Jamie is released from custody by Detective Jim Lipton due to lack of evidence, he spots inside Billy's box a mysterious message about "Mary Shaw", a deceased ventriloquist from his hometown, Raven's Fair.

Returning to Raven's Fair, now old and rundown, Jamie visits his estranged, wealthy and wheelchair-using father, Edward, and his much-younger wife, Ella, for information regarding Mary Shaw. Dismissing the information he does receive as superstitions, Jamie arranges for Lisa's funeral with the help of a local mortician named Henry Walker. Henry's senile wife, Marion, warns Jamie that Mary Shaw's spirit is dangerous and urges him to bury Billy. Jamie does so but is confronted by Detective Lipton, who followed Jamie and finds his actions suspicious.

Henry explains to Jamie that Mary Shaw was a famous and popular ventriloquist who was publicly humiliated when a young boy named Michael rudely claimed that he could see her lips moving during one of her performances. Some weeks later, Michael disappeared and his family blamed it on Mary and lynched her. Mary's last wish was to have her body turned into a doll and buried with her 101 dolls, who she called her children. Henry, then still a child, saw Shaw (after she was turned into a dummy) rise up, but was spared thanks to his silence, because Mary takes her revenge by killing those who scream. Jamie finds out that Michael, who actually was murdered by Mary Shaw, was his great-uncle. As part of Mary's lynching, the Ashen family forced her to scream and permanently silenced her by cutting her tongue out; as such, she has since been seeking revenge against their entire bloodline and all those in Raven's Fair by killing them using the same method. 

Mary Shaw kills Henry and Detective Lipton discovers that all of Mary Shaw's dolls have been dug up. He informs Jamie and is just about to arrest him, still suspecting him, when Jamie receives a call from "Henry", asking him to go to Shaw's old theatre to prove his innocence, and Jamie convinces Lipton to comply. At the ruined theater, Jamie and Lipton discover 100 of the dolls in their massive display case, along with Michael's body, which had been turned into a marionette. Mary's ghost appears to them and reveals to Jamie that she killed Lisa because, unbeknownst to him, she was pregnant with his child, thereby killing any potential newborn of the Ashen family. Jamie and Lipton burn the theatre and all of Shaw's dolls, but while they escape, Lipton trips and ends up screaming, sealing his fate.

Back at his father's residence, Jamie is confronted by Mary, but repels her by throwing Billy into the fireplace. He learns, much to his horror, that his father actually died long ago; the current "Edward" is actually a doll converted from his corpse, controlled by Ella, who is the "perfect doll" that Mary Shaw created just before her death. Jamie screams in terror as Ella becomes possessed by Mary and kills him.

Jamie, now a puppet, recites a nursery rhyme about Shaw while a photo album with other human puppets is shown: Lisa, Henry, Lipton, Edward, Ella, and Jamie himself. Mary closes the book, finally completing her revenge.

Cast
 Ryan Kwanten as Jamie Ashen 
 Amber Valletta as Ella Ashen
 Donnie Wahlberg as Detective Jim Lipton
 Bob Gunton as Edward Ashen
 Michael Fairman as Henry Walker
 Keir Gilchrist as Young Henry Walker
 Joan Heney as Marion Walker
 Laura Regan as Lisa Ashen
 Judith Roberts as Mary Shaw
 Steven Taylor as Michael Ashen
 Dmitry Chepovetsky as Richard Walker
 Shelley Peterson as Lisa's Mom
 Enn Reitel as Billy (voice)
 Fred Tatasciore as the Clown Doll (voice)
 Julian Richings as Boz (uncredited and deleted scenes)

Production 

Filming took place in Toronto, Ontario, Canada.

Release
Dead Silence was released in the United States on March 16, 2007.

Box office
In the United States, as of April 16, 2007, the film's total domestic gross has been worth US$16.8 million (according to Box Office Mojo), and screenings of Dead Silence were ceased in most theatres 16 days following its release; the film's estimated production budget was US$20 million. As of April 1, 2009, US$5,572,971 has been generated globally. Worldwide, the film has grossed $22,382,047.

Critical reception

On Rotten Tomatoes, the film has a rating of 21%, based on 81 reviews, with an average rating of 4.00/10. The site's critical consensus reads, "More tasteful than recent slasher flicks, but Dead Silence is undone by boring characters, bland dialogue, and an unnecessary and obvious twist ending." On Metacritic, the film holds a score of 34 out of 100, based on 15 reviews, indicating "generally unfavorable reviews".

Home video
The film was released on DVD and HD DVD on June 26, 2007, with an "unrated" version also released. The film has since grossed US$17,304,718 in overall DVD sales.

Dead Silence was released on Blu-ray Disc in the U.K. on October 25, 2010. In May 2015, it was announced that Universal Studios would be releasing the film to Blu-ray Disc in the U.S. It was released on August 11, 2015.

Soundtrack

Lakeshore Records released the soundtrack of Dead Silence on March 20, 2007. The CD contains 31 tracks, the first track being the song "We Sleep Forever" performed by American rock band Aiden (despite not actually being featured in the film itself). The rest of the CD is taken up by Charlie Clouser's film score. Clouser has worked on many film scores, such as the Saw series and Resident Evil: Extinction.

Track listing
 "We Sleep Forever" – Aiden
 "Main Titles" [2:56]
 "Sheet" [1:08]
 "Blood" [1:41]
 "Apartment" [1:28]
 "Raven's Fair" [0:59]
 "Dad's House" [0:47]
 "Ella" [1:29]
 "My Son" [1:03]
 "What Poem?" [1:31]
 "Caskets" [1:57]
 "Motel Hearse" [1:22]
 "It Can't Be" [1:40]
 "Funeral" [0:49]
 "Billy" [2:42]
 "Perplexed" [1:25]
 "Steal Billy" [0:50]
 "Lips Moving" [1:57]
 "Coffin" [2:16]
 "Photos" [1:36]
 "Map Drive" [0:49]
 "Guignol" [1:57]
 "He Talked" [3:06]
 "It's Soup" [2:09]
 "Full Tank" [1:49]
 "Doll Wall" [1:37]
 "All the Dolls" [1:07]
 "One Left" [0:27]
 "Mary Shaw" [0:31]
 "Dummy" [1:05]
 "Family Album" [0:37]

Alternate scenes

Many alternate scenes were released on the unrated DVD and HD-DVD. They are listed below:

 Detective Lipton has a conversation with his colleague before interrogating Jamie on Lisa's death.
 Mary Shaw's performance at the theatre is extended.
 Jamie walking through Mary Shaw's property is slightly extended.
 The unrated version depicts Detective Lipton rowing the boat towards the dilapidated theatre to chase Jamie.
 Mary Shaw is depicted several times throughout the unrated version with a long, slimy tongue, made of the numerous tongues from her victims. In the scenes, she uses her tongue to frighten her victims, making it slither from her mouth (she licks Jamie's cheek in one scene). Along with the tongues of her victims, Mary acquires their voices as well.
 Jamie attempting to swim out of the theatre is slightly extended.
 In an alternate ending, Ella simply knocks Jamie out after he discovers his father was a puppet all along. Then, she explains that the original Ella was a human being with Edward as an abusive husband. Edward knocked her down the stairs and killed their unborn child. Ella dug up the grave where the puppet Billy was buried and became possessed by Mary Shaw. Afterwards, Ella makes a family photograph and then (dressed as Mary Shaw) tells a bedtime story to a child by candlelight, later revealed to be a traumatized and brainwashed (yet still very much alive) Jamie with his voice removed or tongue ripped out (or it would have been had they added the visual effect planned). This story is the poem. Ella also reveals that only silence can save you from Mary Shaw. Then she blows out the candle, ending the film.
 The Billy puppet from the Saw franchise makes a brief cameo; it can be seen sitting on the floor as Jamie starts to walk towards the clown doll.

Post-release commentary
In his personal blog, screenwriter Whannell reveals the origins of the film within the context of the Hollywood film industry. In a candid post entitled "Dud Silence: The Hellish Experience of Making a Bad Horror Film", Whannell explains that the film was conceived following the advice of his agent at the time and that a "script doctor" was eventually employed by the production studio. Whannell concludes the post with a description of the key lessons that were learned following the Dead Silence experience:

References

External links
 
 
  
 
 
 

2007 films
2007 horror films
American supernatural horror films
Films scored by Charlie Clouser
Films directed by James Wan
Mannequins in films
Films with screenplays by James Wan
Films with screenplays by Leigh Whannell
Ventriloquism
Universal Pictures films
Films about spirit possession
2000s supernatural horror films
Horror films about toys
2000s English-language films
2000s American films